, also known as "Osugi-san" by locals, is the world's tallest Japanese Cedar (Cryptomeria japonica) and is said to be over 3000 years old. It is located in Ōtoyo, Kōchi, Japan within the grounds of Yasaka Jinja.

General description
Sugi no Osugi actually consists of two separate trees, “Minami Osugi” (“South Giant Cedar”), and “Kita Osugi” (“North Giant Cedar”) merged at the roots. As such it is sometimes collectively referred to as “Meoto Sugi” (“Wedded Cedar”). Based upon legends of its planting by Susanoo-no-Mikoto, Sugi no Osugi's estimated age is said to be over 3000 years old.

Notable events
 In 1947, a 10-year old Hibari Misora was involved in a serious bus collision in Ōtoyo, Kōchi. While recovering from injuries she stayed in the town and reportedly visited Sugi no Osugi and wish to become a famous singer. She returned to Tokyo where she began her recording career in 1949 at age 12. 
 In 1952, Sugi no Osugi was recognised by the government as a special national monument.

See also
 List of individual trees
 List of oldest trees
 List of records of Japan
 Great sugi of Kayano
 Jōmon Sugi

Sources
This article incorporates material from the article 杉の大スギ (Sugi no Osugi) in the Japanese Wikipedia, retrieved on January 21, 2016.

References

Individual conifers
Individual trees in Japan
 
Shikoku region